The Cornelia Street Cafe, was a restaurant & bar at 29 Cornelia Street in New York City's Greenwich Village, opened in July 1977. The cafe closed at the end of 2018, due to rising rents from the gentrification of the West Village; ending on its holiday closed day of New Years 2019. The cafe had been voted one of the best places to listen to jazz music in the world.

Business
In the 21st century, the Cornelia Street Cafe was a restaurant and nightclub, showcasing musicians, poets, writers, and artists. In 1998, the Cafe was one of the restaurants recognized by the Greenwich Village Society for Historic Preservation with a Village Award presented to "Cornelia Street Restaurants".

Songwriters Exchange
In December 1977 the then-fledgling cafe hosted the first meeting of the Songwriters Exchange, a weekly gathering in which the Village's songwriters could present their new songs--and only new songs--to their peers. Two years later the cafe sponsored "Cornelia Street: The Songwriters Exchange," an LP of eight Village singer-songwriters; released by Stash Records, the LP was named "Album Of The Month" by Stereo Review in December 1979, and was later re-released as a cd. It has the first known recordings of several prominent Village artists, including Cliff Eberhardt, David Massengill, Rod MacDonald, Martha Hogan, Michael Fracasso, Brian Rose, Eliot Simon and Lucy Kaplansky (as Simon & Kaplansky), and was Tom Intondi's second recorded work.

References

External links

 Cornelia Street Cafe

Music venues in Manhattan
Former music venues in New York City
Nightclubs in Manhattan
Defunct nightclubs in New York (state)
Greenwich Village
Restaurants in Manhattan
Defunct restaurants in New York City
1977 establishments in New York City
2019 disestablishments in New York (state)
Restaurants established in 1977
Restaurants disestablished in 2019